Rudolf Adler (born May 25, 1941, in Brno, Czechoslovakia) is a Czech film director, screenwriter and pedagogue.

Education
Rudolf Adler studied film directing at the Film and TV School of the Academy of Performing Arts in Prague, graduating in 1966. Concomitantly Adler wrote the libretto for composer Zdeněk Pololáník's ballet Mechanismus; their collaborative work premiered at the FX Šalda Theater, Liberec, in 1964.

Career
When Czechoslovakia hosted joint Warsaw Pact military maneuvers in September 1966, Rudolf Adler, then an Army filmmaker, was sent to south South Bohemia to document war games.

At a time when Czechoslovakia's communist regime sought control of the arts, making it difficult if not impossible for the public to gain access to unofficial ideas and expressions, Adler, alongside colleagues Ivan Balaďa and Vladimír Drha, pushed the borders of the possible—some of their films qualify as avant-garde and/or auteur films.

He has directed more than 100 films. Among them are Strepy pro Evu (1978), Chlapská dovolenka (1988), and the documentary Masks, Jesters, Demons (2002), in which he and cowriter Ludvík Baran examine historic, ritualistic uses of face masks in the Czech lands and throughout the world. As script editor and supervising editor, he contributed to I, Olga Hepnarová, a 2016 winner of Czech Lion and Czech Film Critics' awards.

FAMU
Since the late 1980s Adler has taught documentary filmmaking at the Film and TV School of the Academy of Performing Arts in Prague (FAMU), serving at different times in capacities of professor and department head.

References

External links
 Rudolf Adler, Česko-Slovenská filmová databáze.

1941 births
Film people from Brno
Czech film directors
Czechoslovak film directors
Czech screenwriters
Male screenwriters
Academy of Performing Arts in Prague alumni
Academic staff of the Academy of Performing Arts in Prague
Living people